In geometry, the elongated square pyramid is one of the Johnson solids. As the name suggests, it can be constructed by elongating a square pyramid by attaching a cube to its square base. Like any elongated pyramid, it is topologically (but not geometrically) self-dual.

Formulae 

The following formulae for the height, surface area and volume can be used if all faces are regular, with edge length :

Dual polyhedron 

The dual of the elongated square pyramid has 9 faces: 4 triangular, 1 square and 4 trapezoidal.

Related polyhedra and honeycombs

The elongated square pyramid can form a tessellation of space with tetrahedra, similar to a modified tetrahedral-octahedral honeycomb.

See also
Elongated square bipyramid

References

External links
 

Johnson solids
Self-dual polyhedra
Pyramids and bipyramids